Lake Dunlap was a reservoir on the Guadalupe River near the town of New Braunfels in Guadalupe County, Texas, United States. The reservoir was formed in 1931 by the construction of a dam to provide hydroelectric power to the area. Management of the dam and lake was assumed by the Guadalupe-Blanco River Authority on May 1, 1963. Lake Dunlap serves as a venue for outdoor recreation, including fishing and boating.

Fish and plant life 
Lake Dunlap is stocked with species of fish intended to improve the utility of the reservoir for recreational fishing.  Fish present in Lake Dunlap include catfish, crappie, striped bass, and largemouth bass.

Recreational uses 
The only free public access to the lake is a boat ramp located at the overpass of Interstate Highway 35 in New Braunfels. The lake level is down almost 13 feet due to the broken spill-gate, however the body of water is still navigable in certain areas although hazards such as stumps and rocks are prevalent. Lake Dunlap offers mostly calm water due to its narrow size (in parts) and protection from wind by shoreline trees. Wakeboarders, skiers, and other recreational enthusiasts use Lake Dunlap daily due to its family friendly calmness, temperature, and status of near-private lake, however watersports since the dam broke are mostly limited to areas closest to the dam where the water is the deepest. Boaters have to proceed with caution as the lake has numerous unmarked stumps.

Dam failure 
On the morning of May 14, 2019, at 8:05 am local, the dam's 90-year-old middle spillway unexpectedly collapsed, nearly draining the lake by day's end. The lower, concrete portion of the dam remains in place. The collapse was due to ageing structural steel. The Guadalupe-Blanco River Authority worked with lakeside residents who formed an engineering and technical committee and a temporary water-control improvement district. Engineers and the Texas Water Development Board devised a solution to replace the spill gates at Dunlap and GBRA's other remaining aging dams. On November 3, 2020, the residents of Lake Dunlap voted on and passed three propositions which allow for the creation of a formal water-control district and assessment of ad valorem taxes that will fund the construction of a new dam. The construction of the new design is estimated to be completed in May 2023.

See also 
 Lake Dunlap, Texas – residential community and census-designated place.

References

External links 
 Lake Dunlap –  Guadalupe-Blanco River Authority

Dunlap
Protected areas of Guadalupe County, Texas
New Braunfels, Texas
Guadalupe-Blanco River Authority
Bodies of water of Guadalupe County, Texas
Dam failures in the United States
1931 establishments in Texas